Cătălin Hîldan Stadium is a multi-use stadium in Brănești, Ilfov County, Romania. It was the home ground of Victoria Brănești, a professional football club founded in 1968 and dissolved in 2012. It holds 2,500 people, all on seats.

The stadium is named after Cătălin Hîldan, the former Dinamo Bucharest player who died on the field during a game.

References

Link
Cătălin Hîldan Stadium

Football venues in Romania